A play date is an arranged appointment for children to get together and play.

Play date or playdate or variation, may also refer to:

Music
Play Date (album), a 2002 album by Euge Groove
"Playdate" (song), a 2002 song by Euge Groove off the eponymous album Play Date (album)
"Play Date" (song), a 2015 song by Melanie Martinez
"Playdate", a 2018 song by Exo-CBX song, from Blooming Days
Play Date, a children's music project by Shanti Wintergate

Television
Playdate (British TV series), a 2006 British television series
Playdate (Canadian TV series), a 1961–64 Canadian TV series
"Play Date" (Adventure Time), a 2013 episode of Adventure Time
"Playdates" (Modern Family), a 2016 episode of Modern Family
"Playdate" (Superstore), a 2020 episode of Superstore

Other uses
Playdate (console), a handheld video game console developed by Panic

See also

 
 
 
 Play (disambiguation)
 Date (disambiguation)